Kandreho is a municipality in western Madagascar in Betsiboka Region approximately  north-west of the capital Antananarivo. It is situated at 144 km from Maevatanana.

See also
 Kandreho Formation
 Kasijy Reserve

References

 Alimentation en Eau potable - Ville de Kandreho

Populated places in Betsiboka